Kuks is a municipality and village in Trutnov District in the Hradec Králové Region of the Czech Republic. It has about 300 inhabitants. It lies on the Elbe river. Its main feature is a Baroque spa building with famous sculptures by Matthias Braun. The village with the Baroque complex is protected by law as a monument reservation.

Administrative parts
The village of Kašov is an administrative part of Kuks.

Etymology
The name is probably derived from the Old German word for share of mining revenue, according to another theory the word meant ore smelting remains.

Geography
It lies on the border of three geomorphological regions: the lowlands of East Elbe Table and Orlice Table, and the Jičín Uplands. It is situated on the Elbe river.

History

Before any settlement was established here, the area was used for gold panning. The Kuks village was founded after the spa was founded here. In 1684, the estate was acquired by Count Franz Anton von Sporck.

On the slope of the Elbe in Kuks, there used to be mineral springs. In 1692–1696, Count Sporck directed three of them at one place and built a simple spa. When the healing effects of the water were proven by professors of the Charles-Ferdinand University and experts from Baden-Baden, Sporck enlarged the spa.

In 1696, he had built Chapel of the Assumption of the Virgin Mary, followed by chateau in front of it in 1710. In 1707–1715, the hospital and the Church of the Holy Trinity with the crypt were built. The interiors and exteriors were decorated with Baroque sculptures by Matthias Braun, the most famous of which are the Virtues and Vices. Behind the hospital there was a garden, and the whole complex was closed by a cemetery.

Sporck died in 1738 and his heirs were not interested in maintaining the spa. A flood in 1740 destroyed most of the infrastructure and put the spa out of business. Kuks turned into a quiet village with mostly German population. In 1896, the uninhabited chateau burnt down and in 1901, its ruins were demolished.

In 1938, it was occupied by the Wehrmacht as one of the municipalities in Sudetenland. After the war, the German-speaking population was expelled in 1945 and replaced by Czech settlers.

Sights

The hospital, church, and pharmacy buildings have been preserved, along with historic furnishings, and are considered masterpieces of the Baroque. The complex is nowadays owned by the state. Since 1946, the building of the hospital houses a museum of Baroque art and Czech pharmacy.

Braun's exterior sculptures also survive, but have been fast eroding due to the action of water, from rainfall and moisture rising from the ground. For this reason, the Kuks Forest Sculptures were listed in the 2000 World Monuments Watch by the World Monuments Fund. With the financial support of American Express, pump boxes were installed to drive groundwater away from the sculptures and low-lying vegetation was removed to enhance air circulation in the damp wooded environment.

Notable people
Johann Balzer (1738–1799), engraver

References

External links

Official website of the Kuks Hospital
Virtual tour of the Kuks Hospital
Short information on Kuks Hospital in English

Villages in Trutnov District
Spa towns in the Czech Republic
Baroque architecture in the Czech Republic